Podgorica is a village south of Videm in the Municipality of Dobrepolje in Slovenia. The area is part of the historical region of Lower Carniola. The municipality is now included in the Central Slovenia Statistical Region.

Church

The local church is dedicated to Our Lady of the Rosary and belongs to the Parish of Dobrepolje–Videm. It dates to the mid-17th century with major 19th-century alterations.

References

External links

Podgorica on Geopedia

Populated places in the Municipality of Dobrepolje